The Whifflet Line is one of the lines within the Strathclyde suburban rail network in Scotland.

History 
The line was built between 1863 and 1865 as the Rutherglen and Coatbridge Railway, part of the Caledonian Railway. It opened to goods traffic (mainly coal and iron) in September 1865 and to passengers in August 1866. It has been in continuous operation ever since. Passenger services ceased in November 1966 following the Beeching Axe (latterly running to ). Between 1972 and 1974 scheduled passenger trains between Glasgow Central and Perth used the route. For the following twenty years, the route was only used for freight and diverted passenger services. However the line was reopened by British Rail to scheduled passenger services with intermediate stations on 4 October 1993, running to the newly built station at  rather than Coatbridge Central as previously.

Line description 
The modern line currently serves seven stations. It connects parts of south east Glasgow, Bargeddie and Coatbridge to Glasgow city centre. Between  and Rutherglen, the line shares the same track as the West Coast Main Line (and is hence electrified) before branching off in a north easterly direction towards Coatbridge (this section is now electrified).

Services 
The route is operated by ScotRail.

1993 to 2002 
Following re-opening as a passenger line, service was provided by a mix of 1980s Class 156 and 1950s Class 101 DMUs. During their final years, the last of BR ScotRail's power-twin Class 101 2-car DMUs, reduced from 3-car by having the centre trailer removed, operated the Whifflet and Paisley Canal lines almost exclusively, based at Corkerhill Depot.  In 2002 the remaining 101s were sent South to Manchester and more modern units took over the services.

2009 service pattern 
Trains operated at a half-hour frequency. All services were scheduled to run as two car trains only, although four carriage services were technically possible. Services were operated using Class 158 DMUs and the occasional Class 156 DMU. Three trains operated on this route during the day, usually remaining dedicated on this service throughout the day.

From December 2014 
In late 2014, the Whifflet Line electrification was commissioned and from 14 December 2014 the service was incorporated into the Argyle Line, operated by EMUs. At the same time an all year round Sunday service commenced. Current Sunday Service is hourly from Balloch to Motherwell via Whifflet

Line Developments 
In 2006, Network Rail announced tentative proposals to electrify the Rutherglen - Whifflet section, as part of a £1.4bn upgrade to Scotland's railways. The main benefits of this scheme were to provide an enhanced frequency for the Whifflet to central Glasgow routes and to provide an electric diversionary path for long distance WCML services. The new timetable came into operation on 14 December 2014, the Whifflet Line has been added to the Argyle Line system with services through Glasgow Central Low Level to the western suburbs.

Sources 
 
 
 Page 25 - First ScotRail timetable for this route.

External links
Video of trains at Whifflet

Transport in Glasgow
Railway lines in Scotland
Standard gauge railways in Scotland
Transport in North Lanarkshire